Atanas Vasilev Atanasov (19 November 1935 – 3 September 2021) was a Bulgarian basketball player. He competed in the men's tournament at the 1956 Summer Olympics, and the 1960 Summer Olympics. He was also a silver medalist at the European Championships in Sofia in 1957, and a bronze medalist at the European Championships in Belgrade in 1961. He was included in the ideal team of the World Championships in Chile, 1959. Atanasov died on 3 September 2021, at the age of 85.

References

External links
 

1935 births
2021 deaths
Basketball players at the 1956 Summer Olympics
Basketball players at the 1960 Summer Olympics
Bulgarian men's basketball players
1959 FIBA World Championship players
Olympic basketball players of Bulgaria
Sportspeople from Pleven